The Harry Hill Movie is a 2013 British musical comedy film, directed by Steve Bendelack and starring Harry Hill. It was written by Hill along with Jon Foster and James Lamont. It revolves around a fictional version of Harry Hill's adventures, with his diesel drinking nan and misdiagnosed hamster. The film was released on 20 December 2013 in the United Kingdom and Ireland.

Plot
The movie begins with a scooter chase between Harry Hill and his nan (Julie Walters) because she didn't know it was him. Afterwards, Harry is sent to get a chicken for lunch, but the chickens fire a machine gun at him and throw a grenade, which Harry throws back into the chicken shed, blowing them up. Nan tells Harry the story of his twin brother, Otto who was abandoned by Nan in the 1970s, claiming it was because she couldn't look after them both, and was raised by Alsatians, though Harry explains to Nan that she has told this story many times before.

Suddenly, Harry and Nan then discover that their beloved pet hamster Abu (Johnny Vegas) is ill, so they take him to the vet. Ed the vet (Simon Bird) and his assistant, Kisko (Guillaume Delaunay) claim that Abu has just a week to live and he is almost put down until Harry takes him back home. Ed and Kisko are then revealed to be working for Harry's twin brother Otto (Matt Lucas), who wants Abu dead.

Ed and Kisko then disguise themselves as a priest and a nun respectively in another attempt to capture Abu, but it goes wrong when Harry walks in on the two trying to kill Abu and thinks they are having gay sex. With the two gone, Abu reveals that he would like to spend his last week alive visiting Rihanna. Harry, who can't communicate with hamsters, misinterprets as him wanting to go Blackpool, and so Harry, his nan and Abu set off in their Rover P6. 

Ed and Kisko pursue the group on the road driving a giant mobile traffic cone, though they end up in "Blackpole - home of the black pole" by mistake. The stay for the night in a B&B owned by The Magic Numbers. The next day, Harry and Nan take Abu on a personal guided tour around a nuclear power plant by Bill the cleaner (Jim Broadbent in drag). Ed and Kisko attempt to capture Abu again (this time by disguising themselves as cleaners), only for the radiation to temporarily transform him into a kaiju-esque giant monster. 

Later, Harry, Nan and Abu encounter Barney Cull (Marc Wootton), a member of the Shell People (a.k.a the Makuktuksoautrakuherx). He asks Harry and the others to save his people's children from a gift shop. The heist is a success and they are invited back to the Shell People's cave where Harry falls for the Shell King Conch (Julian Barratt)'s daughter, Michelle (Sheridan Smith). He leaves after being unable to cope living under water. 

The three continue their road trip only to end up in a boxing match (set up by Ed disguised as a ringmaster-like referee) where Harry has to fight Kisko to keep Abu. He successfully wins with a free stick of rock. Later on, the car runs out of petrol in the middle of the woods and Harry and his nan leave Abu behind while they search for a petrol station. He's almost kidnapped again by Ed and Kisko only to leave the car in pieces.

Meanwhile, Otto teams them up with a master of disguise fox Renard Depardieu. Harry, his Nan and Abu hitch a ride in a limo with Justin Bieber and Selena Gomez (who are actually Ed and Kisko in disguise) and they arrive in Blackpool to see a show featuring The Dachsund Five (a tribute band to the Jackson 5). Harry is reunited with Michelle (much to his Nan's dismay) and Abu is finally kidnapped and replaced with Renard in a hamster hoodie.

Harry and Nan go looking for Abu. They follow a trail of BBQ beef Hula Hoops crisps to Otto's hideout, where Otto reveals his plan to turn Abu into a model figurine for his collection as an act of revenge for being deserted. During a fight between the two, Harry's nan reveals that she got rid of Otto because she kept getting him and Harry mixed up. After being chased away by killer brains, Harry and his nan are saved by the Shell People (including Barney who shoots one of the brains with a bazooka), to which his Nan accepts his and Michelle's love. Harry pursues his brother to the top of the Blackpool Tower. Nan rescues him and Abu in a helicopter, Otto is defeated, and Ed and Kisko reform. 

Abu coughs up a green felt tip pen which turns out to be the cause of his illness, meaning that he wasn't dying after all. Ed explains that hamsters like sucking on pens, and he gave it to Abu so he would be sick and start this whole plan, even though Harry points out that he could have just kidnapped Abu then. Everyone celebrates in the Shell People's cave by singing You Got The Love by Florence and the Machine.

The film was dedicated to a hamster named Dylan (1978 - 1980).

Cast
 Harry Hill as a fictional version of himself.
 Julie Walters as Harry's Nan.
 Matt Lucas as Otto Hill, Harry's evil twin brother who got separated from Harry when they were younger and was raised by Alsatians.
 Simon Bird as Ed, a vet who works for Otto. 
 Sheridan Smith as Michelle, the daughter of the shell king.
 Johnny Vegas as the voice of Abu, Harry's pet hamster. Richard Coombs provides the puppetry for Abu.
 Julian Barratt as Conch, the king of the shell people.
 Marc Wootton as Barney Cull, a member of the shell people. 
 Jim Broadbent as Bill the cleaner.
 Guillaume Delaunay as Kisko, Ed's partner in crime.
 The Magic Numbers as themselves.
 Christine Ozanne as Mrs. Pickford, Harry and Nan's neighbour who has a brick for a replacement pet due to the death of her dog.
 Shingai Shoniwa as a singing Car Wash Attendant.
 Sean Foley as Renard Depardieu, a French-accented fox who is the master of disguise.

Production
In February 2012, before the end of Harry Hill's TV Burp, Digital Spy reported Hill was to sign a £2 million movie deal with Channel 4, which would later become The Harry Hill Movie.

Filming
Set in Blackpool and London, the Blackpool scenes in the film were shot in the town itself. Greatstone-on-Sea, Kent doubled as "Blackpole". The fuel station scene was shot at Millbrook Proving Ground, Milton Keynes.

In real life, Blackpole is an inland suburb of Worcester, which, like the fictional town in the movie, is frequently confused for Blackpool by satellite navigation users.

Music
 "Popcorn" – Performed by Steve Brown
 "Days" – Performed by Harry Hill
 "Blackpool!" – Performed by Harry Hill and Julie Walters
 "Nutbush City Limits" – Performed by Matt Lucas
 "London's Burning" – Written by Harry Hill
 "B & B Song" – Performed by The Magic Numbers
 "Drive Through My Carwash" – Performed by Shingai Shoniwa and Harry Hill
 "Down in the Deep Blue Sea" – Performed by Sheridan Smith
 "ABC" - Performed by The Dachsund Five
 "I Want You Back" – Performed by The Dachsund Five
 "Celebration" – Performed by Kool & the Gang
 "Fight!" (Theme from 'Flashing Blade') – Performed by The Musketeers
 "And the Rain Falls in My Heart" – Performed by the cast
 "Frere Jacques" – Performed by Harry Hill
 "Plastination" – Performed by Steve Brown and The Plastinettes
 "You Got The Love" – Performed by The Cast
 "Get Down" – Performed by Gilbert O'Sullivan

Release and reception
The film was theatrically released on 20 December 2013 by Entertainment Film Distributors, and was released on DVD and Blu-ray on 14 April 2014 by Entertainment Film Distributors. When the film was released in the United Kingdom, it opened on #7.

Critical reception
On review aggregator Rotten Tomatoes, The Harry Hill Movie has an approval rating of 33% based on reviews from 6 critics, with an average rating of 4.4/10.

Ryan Gilbey of The Guardian gave it 2 out of 5 and wrote "What's missing is any persuasive comic force or vision to justify the film's place in cinemas rather than in petrol station bargain bins".

The Independent were also critical saying its screenplay wasn't "so much offbeat as utterly feeble" and "it is very hard to keep patience with a story which hinges on the health of a toy hamster". However Graham Young for the Birmingham Mail, on a more positive note said, "Uniquely British and deliriously silly, Harry Hill offers up the laughs".

Tom Huddleston from Time Out gave it three stars, saying "this has bigger laughs" and "the set-piece gags are memorable"; however, he added "There’s not enough here to sustain 88 minutes, too many of the jokes fall flat... There will be those who find The Harry Hill Movie about as amusing as a trip to the dentist. They’re wrong."

Trivia
A Typographical error in the film's credits leads Shingai Shoniwa to be named as a 'cash' rather than 'car' wash attendant.

References

External links
 
 

2013 films
2013 independent films
2010s comedy road movies
2010s musical comedy films
British comedy road movies
British independent films
British musical comedy films
Films about families
Films set in Blackpool
Films set in London
Films shot in London
2013 comedy films
2010s English-language films
2010s British films
Harry Hill